Mario Montoya may refer to:
 Mario Montoya (swimmer) (born 1989), Olympic swimmer from Costa Rica
 Mario Montoya Uribe (born 1949), Colombian military general
 Mario Montoya (footballer), Salvadoran footballer